This listing is limited to those independent companies and subsidiaries notable enough to have their own articles in Wikipedia.  Both going concerns and defunct firms are included, as well as firms that were part of the pharmaceutical industry at some time in their existence.  Included here are companies engaged not only in pharmaceutical development, but also supply chain management and device development, including compounding pharmacies.  Retail pharmacies; firms specialized in the collection, fractionation and distribution of human blood; and medical device manufacturers where the device is not related to pharmaceutical administration are not included.  Entry titles have been shortened in a number of cases, so that if the article title of a company is "XYZ Pharma", for instance, the entry will appear here as "XYZ".

Companies which existed as a joint venture for their entire existence are indicated by a super-script "JV", as in PerseidJV.

Alphabetical listing—Active firms

#—A

 AAH (subsidiary of Celesio; 1923– )
 Abbott (1888– )
 AbbVie (2013– )
 Acadia (1993– )
 Acorda (1995– )
 Adcock Ingram (1890– )
 Advanced Chemical Industries (conglomerate which includes a pharmaceutical subsidiary; 1968– )
 Advanz (1963– )
 Advaxis (2006– )
 ACG Group (1961– )
 Ajanta (1973– )
 Alcon (former Novartis subsidiary; 2019– )
 Alembic (1907– )
 Alexion (1992– )
 ALK-Abelló (1923– )
 Alkaloid (conglomerate which includes a pharmaceutical subsidiary; 1936– )
 Alkermes (1987– )
 Almirall (1943– )
 Alnylam (2002– )
 Alphapharm (1982– )
 Altana (chemical company that once had a pharmaceuticals division; ????–2006)
 Alzheon (2013– )
 Amgen (1980– )
 Amneal (2002– )
 Angelini (1919- )
 Antibody Solutions (1995- )
 Apotex (1974– )
 Arbutus (2007– )
 AryoGen (2009– )
 Aspen Pharmacare (a pharma holding company; 1850– )
 Assertio (1995– )
 Astellas (2005– )
 AstraZeneca (1999– )
 Aurobindo (1986– )
 Avax (bef. 2006– )
 Avella (1996– )
 Aventis (subsidiary of Sanofi; 1956– )

B—D 

 B. Braun Melsungen (1839– )
 Bausch & Lomb (subsidiary of Bausch Health; 1853– )
 Bausch Health (1959– )
 Baxter (1931– )
 Bayer (1863– )
 BCM (subsidiary of Fareva; 1991– )
 Benitec (1997– )
 Beximco (1980– )
 Bharat Biotech (1996- ) 
 Bial (1924– )
 Biocon (1978– )
 BioCryst (1986– )
 Bio Farma (1890– )
 Biogen (1978– )
 BioMarin (1997– )
 bioMérieux (1963– )
 BiondVax (2003– )
 Bioverativ (2016– )
 Biovest (????– )
 Biovista (2005– )
 Bluepharma (1990s– )
 Boehringer Ingelheim (1885– )
 Bosnalijek (1951– )
 Bristol-Myers Squibb (1887– )
 BTG (1991– )
 Cadila Healthcare (1952– )
 Cadila Pharmaceuticals (1952– )
 Canadian Plasma Resources (2012– )
 Capsugel (1931– )
 Catabasis (2008– )
 Catalent (2007– )
 Cathay Drug (1952– )
 Celesio (1835– )
 Celgene (1986– )
 Celltrion (2002– )
 Century (1966– )
 Ceragenix (????– )
 Chemidex (1981– )
 Chiesi (1935– )
 Chugai (1943– )
 CinnaGen (1994– )
 Cipla (1935– )
 Clovis Oncology (2009– )
 Coco (2013– )
 Crookes Healthcare (subsidiary of Reckitt Benckiser; 1918– )
 CSL (1916– )
 CSL Behring (subsidiary of CSL; 1904– )
 CureVac (2000– )
 CytRx (1985– )
 Daiichi Sankyo (2005– )
 Debiopharm (1979– )
 Dentsply Sirona (1899– )
 Deurali-Janta (1988– )
 Diffusion (2001– )
 Dr. Reddy's (1984– )

E—L

 Eisai (1944– )
 Elder (1989– )
 Eli Lilly and Company (1876– ) 
 Emcure (1983– )
 Emergent (1998– )
 Endo (1997– )
 Eskayef (1990– )
 Esteve (1920– )
 Fabre-Kramer (1992– )
 Fareva (1985– )
 Faron (2003– )
 Ferring (1950– )
 Fortress (2006– )
 Fresenius (1912– )
 Galderma (1981– )
 Gedeon Richter (1901– )
 General (1984– )
 Genmab (1999– )
 Gilead, parent of Kite (1987– )
 Glatt group (1954– )
 Glenmark (1977– )
 Grifols (1940– )
 Grindeks (1991– )
 Grünenthal (1946– )
 GSK (2000– )
 Help Remedies (2008– )
 Himispherx (1990– )
 Hetero Drugs (1993– )
 Hikma (1978– )
 Hisamitsu (1847– )
 Horizon (2005– )
 Hovione (1959– )
 Huadong Medicine (1993– )
 Incepta (1999– )
 Incyte (1991– )
 Intas (1984– )
 Intellia Therapeutics (2014– )
 Ionis (1989– )
 Ipca (1949– )
 Ipsen (1929– )
 ITH (2008– )
 Janssen Pharmaceutica (1953– )
 Jazz (2003– )
 JN-International Medical Corporation (1998– )
 Johnson & Johnson (1886– )
 Julphar (1980– )
 Kalbe Farma (1966– )
 Kimia Farma (1971– )
 King (subsidiary of Pfizer; 1994– )
 Kissei (1946- )
 Kite (2009– )
 Kyowa Hakko Kirin (1949– )
 Laboratoires Pierre Fabre (1951– )
 Leo (1908– )
 Locus (2015– )
 Lundbeck (1915– )
 Lupin Limited (1968– )

M—P

 Mallinckrodt (1867– )
 MannKind (1991– )
 McGuff (1979– )
 McNeil Consumer Healthcare (subsidiary of Johnson & Johnson; 1879– )
 Medac (1970– )
 Medinfar (1970– )
 Melior Discovery (2005– )
 Menarini (1886– )
 Merck & Co. (1891– )
 Merck Group (1668– )
 Mitsubishi Tanabe (2007– )
 Moderna (2010– )
 Molecular Partners (2004– )
 Mundipharma (1952– )
 Mustang (2015– )
 NovaBay (2000– )
 Novartis (1996– )
 Novavax (1987– )
 Novo Nordisk (1923– )
 Noxxon (1997– )  
 Octapharma (1983– )
 Onyx (1992– )
 Orexo (1995– )
 Orion (1917– )
 Ortho-McNeil (1993– )
 Otsuka (1964– )
 Oxford BioMedica (1995– )
 PainCeptor Pharma (2004- )
 Panacea Biotec (1984– )
 Parke-Davis (subsidiary of Pfizer; 1866– )
 PATH (1977– )
 Patheon (1974– )
 Perrigo (1887– )
 Pfizer (1849– )
 Pharmaceutical Product Development (1985– )
 Pharma Medica (1998– )
 Pharma Nord (1981– )
 Pharmacosmos (1965– )
 Pharmascience (1983– )
 Piramal Group (1984– )
 Procter & Gamble (1837– )
 ProMetic Life Sciences (1994– )
 ProQR (2012– )
 Purdue Pharma (1892– )

Q—T

 Quantum Pharmaceutical (2004- )
 Reckitt (1999– )
 Regeneron (1988– )
 Repligen (1981– )
 Roche (1896– )
 Rubicon Research (1999– )
 Saidal (1984– )
 Sangamo Therapeutics (1995– )
 Sanofi (2004– )
 Serum Institute of India (1966– )
 Servier (1954– )
 Shionogi (1878– )
 Sido Muncul (1940– )
 SIGA Technologies (1995– )
 Sigma Healthcare  (1912–2010)
 Sinopharm Group  (1998– )
 Solvay (1863– )
 SPC (1971– )
 Sphere Fluidics (2010– )
 Square (1958– )
 STADA Arzneimittel (1895– )
 Stiefel (subsidiary of GlaxoSmithKline; 1847– )
 Strides Arcolab
 Stryker (1941– )
 Sumitomo Pharma (2005– )
 Sun (1983– )
 Sunovion (formerly Sepracor)  (1984– )
 Sutro (2003– )
 Swedish Orphan Biovitrum (2001– )
 Takeda (1781– )
 Taro (1950– )
 Tasly (1994– )
 Teva (1901– )
 Teva Active Pharmaceutical Ingredients (division of Teva; 1935– )
 Theramex (2018– )
 Torrent (1959– )
 Turing (2015– )

U—Z 

 UCB (1928– )
 Unichem (1944– )
 USV Private Limited (1961– )
 Veloxis (1999– )
 Vertex (1989– )
 ViroMed (1996– )
 Wockhardt (1960s– )
 WuXi AppTec (2000– )
 Yuhan (1926– )
 Zandu Realty (1910– )
 Zentiva (1998– )
 Zoetis (1952– )

Alphabetical listing—Defunct firms

#—A 

 3M Pharmaceuticals (mid-1960s to 2006; formerly Riker Laboratories)
 Actavis (1984–2015)
 Actelion (1997–2017)
 Allen & Hanburys (1715–1958)
 Allergan (1948–2015)
 Allergan (2013–2019; formerly Actavis)
 Amersham plc (1946-2003)
 Amylin (1987–2012)
 Anacor (2002–2016)
 Aptalis (2011–2014)
 ARIAD (1991–2017)
 Astra (1913–1999)

B—D 

 Barr (1970–2008)
 Baxalta (2015–2016)
 Biolex (1997–2012)
 Bionova (1996–abt 2012)
 Biovail (1991–2010)
 Boehringer Mannheim (1817—1997)
 Cambridge Antibody Technology (1989–2007)
 Cangene (1984–2014)
 CareFusion (2009–2015)
 Celltech (1980–2004)
 Cephalon (1987–2011)
 Chiron Corporation (1981–2006)
 CoTherix (2000–2007)
 Crucell (2000–2010)
 Cubist (1992–2015)
 Cynapsus (1984–2016)
 Dabur (1884–2008)
 Dawakhana Shifaul Amraz (1894–2000)

E—L 

 Forest Laboratories (1956–2014)
 G.D. Searle (1888–1985)
 G.F. Harvey Company (1880–1958)
 GPC Biotech (1997–2009)
 Hoechst (1863–1999)
 Hospira (2004–2015)
 Human Genome Sciences (1992–2012)
 Institute for OneWorld Health (2000–2011)
 Jenapharm (1950–2001)
 Juno (2013–2018)
 Knoll (1886–1975)

M—P 

 Martek Biosciences (1985-2011)
 Maxygen (1997–2013)
 Medarex (1987–2009)
 Meda (1995–2016)
 MedImmune (1988–2019)
 Mylan (1961–2019)
 Nycomed (1874–2011)
 Ortho (1931–1993)
 Par (1978–2015)
 PerseidJV (2009–2011)
 Pharmacia (1911–2002)
 Plexxikon (2001–2011)
 Pliva (1921–2006)
 Proteolix (2003–2009)

R—T 

 Ranbaxy Laboratories (1961–2014)
 Renovo (1998–2011)
 Rhône-Poulenc (1928–1999)
 Salix (1989–2015)
 Sanofi Pasteur (2004–2016)
 Schering-Plough (1971–2009)
 Serono (1906–2006)
 Shire (1986–2019)
 Smith, Kline & French (1891–2000)
 Sucampo (1996–2018)

U—Z 

 Upjohn (1886–1995)
 Vion (1992–2009)
 Warner-Lambert (1955–2000)
 Wyeth (1860–2009)
 Zeneca (1993–1999)
 ZymoGenetics (1981–2019)

See also
 List of largest biomedical companies by market capitalization
 List of largest biomedical companies by revenue
 List of pharmaceutical manufacturers in the UK

 
 
Medical lists
Knowledge firms